Jocelyn Osorio Alvarez is a Chilean actress and model.

Life and career
She was born and raised in Iquique, Chile. After winning several local beauty competitions, she decided to move to the capital, Santiago, to pursue acting. In 2001 she was offered to participate in the Miss Chile pageant. She refused this offer in order to study drama in London at the Italia Conti Academy of Theatre Arts, where she later earned her BA in acting. After graduating she began touring around Europe performing classical and modern plays which then led to films and TV commercials. Since then she has appeared in many independent films and TV series in the United Kingdom. She has worked for brands such as Herbal Essence, J. C. Penney, Hyundai, Lulu Guinness, and Disaronno. She has also been the subject of a model test photo shoot with L.A. based photographer and graphic designer Lauren N. Dennis.

She is currently resides in Los Angeles.

Filmography

References

External links 
 
Facebook page

1984 births
Living people
Chilean female models
Chilean actresses
Alumni of the Italia Conti Academy of Theatre Arts
People from Iquique
21st-century Chilean women